Novice Gail Fawcett (March 29, 1909 – June 19, 1998) was an American academic administrator who served as the 8th president of Ohio State University from 1956 to 1972.

Early life and education 
Fawcett was born in Gambier, Ohio. He received a Bachelor of Science degree in science and mathematics from Kenyon College in 1931 and a Master of Education from Ohio State University in 1937. He took courses toward a PhD but did not complete the degree.

Career 
A teacher and coach, Fawcett was superintendent of Gambier Public Schools (1934–1938), Defiance Schools (1938–1943), Bexley Schools (1943–47), assistant superintendent in Akron Public Schools (1947–1949), and superintendent of Columbus City Schools in 1949.

Legacy 
The Fawcett Center at Ohio State University and Fawcett Hall at Wright State University are named in his honor.

Further reading
Past Presidents of the Ohio State University
Fawcett Center at Ohio State University
Fawcett Hall at Wright State University

References

1909 births
1998 deaths
Presidents of Ohio State University
Kenyon College alumni
Ohio State University College of Education and Human Ecology alumni
People from Gambier, Ohio
People from Bexley, Ohio
School superintendents in Ohio
20th-century American academics